Phankham Viphavanh (born 14 April 1951) is a Laotian politician, a member of the Politburo and the Executive Committee of the Lao People's Revolutionary Party. He became the Prime Minister of Laos, who was elected by the National Assembly of Laos in March 2021. He retired in December 2022. 

He was deputy minister in the prime minister's office from 2003 to 2005, then was elected to the eighth Party Central Committee in 2006, and became governor of Houaphanh province. He was elected to politburo in 2011, and then held the position of Minister of Education and Sports. He was also the president of the Lao–Vietnam Friendship Association. 

In 2014, he became the Deputy Prime Minister and in April 2016, he was elected as Vice President of Laos.

References

|-

|-

Members of the 8th Central Committee of the Lao People's Revolutionary Party
Members of the 9th Central Committee of the Lao People's Revolutionary Party
Members of the 10th Central Committee of the Lao People's Revolutionary Party
Members of the 11th Central Committee of the Lao People's Revolutionary Party
Members of the 10th Secretariat of the Lao People's Revolutionary Party
Members of the 9th Politburo of the Lao People's Revolutionary Party
Members of the 10th Politburo of the Lao People's Revolutionary Party
Members of the 11th Politburo of the Lao People's Revolutionary Party
Lao People's Revolutionary Party politicians
Government ministers of Laos
Living people
1951 births
Vice presidents of Laos
Education ministers
Prime Ministers of Laos
Deputy Prime Ministers of Laos